Heinz Bigler (21 December 1925 – 20 June 2002) was a Swiss football midfielder who played for Switzerland in the 1954 FIFA World Cup. He also played for BSC Young Boys.

References

External links
FIFA profile

1925 births
2002 deaths
Swiss men's footballers
Switzerland international footballers
Association football midfielders
BSC Young Boys players
1954 FIFA World Cup players
Footballers from Bern
Swiss Super League players